South Wiltshire, formally known as the Southern division of Wiltshire or Wiltshire Southern was a county constituency in the county of Wiltshire in South West England. It returned two Members of Parliament to the House of Commons of the Parliament of the United Kingdom, elected by the bloc vote system.

The constituency was created under the Reform Act 1832 for the 1832 general election, and abolished under the Redistribution of Seats Act 1885 for the 1885 general election.

Boundaries
1832–1885: The Hundreds of Kinwardstone, Heytesbury, Branch and Dole, Elstub and Everley, Amesbury, Warminster, Mere, South Damerham, Downton, Chalk, Dunworth, Cawden and Cadworth, Frustfield, Alderbury, Underditch, and Westbury.

Members of Parliament

Election results

Elections in the 1830s

Elections in the 1840s

 

Herbert was appointed Secretary at War, requiring a by-election.

Elections in the 1850s

 
 

Herbert was appointed Secretary at War, requiring a by-election.

Herbert was appointed Secretary of State for the Colonies, requiring a by-election.

 

 

Herbert was appointed Secretary of State for War, requiring a by-election.

Elections in the 1860s
Herbert was elevated to the peerage, becoming Lord Herbert of Lea and causing a by-election.

Elections in the 1870s

 

Thynne was appointed Treasurer of the Household, requiring a by-election.

Elections in the 1880s

Pleydell-Bouverie was appointed Treasurer of the Household, requiring a by-election.

References 

Parliamentary constituencies in Wiltshire (historic)
Constituencies of the Parliament of the United Kingdom established in 1832
Constituencies of the Parliament of the United Kingdom disestablished in 1885